This is the list of countries by gross fixed investment of infrastructure as percentage of GDP. Gross fixed investment is defined as total business spending on fixed assets, such as factories, machinery, equipment, dwellings, and inventories of raw materials, which provide the basis for future production. It is measured gross of the depreciation of the assets, i.e., it includes investment that merely replaces worn-out or scrapped capital.

The list is based on the CIA World Factbook and World Bank data. Dependent territories and not fully recognized states are not ranked.

References

Lists of countries by economic indicator